Ryno Liebenberg (born 12 December 1983) is a South African professional boxer.

Professional boxing record

References

,

South African male boxers
1983 births
Living people
African Boxing Union champions
Light-heavyweight boxers
Super-middleweight boxers